Nepisiguit may refer to:

 Nepisiguit (electoral district), a riding which elects members to the Legislative Assembly of New Brunswick
 Nepisiguit River, a river in the Canadian province of New Brunswick